Joseph Lawless (March 23, 1890 – February 18, 1923) was an American sports shooter. He competed in the 600m military rifle event at the 1920 Summer Olympics.

References

External links
 

1890 births
1923 deaths
American male sport shooters
Olympic shooters of the United States
Shooters at the 1920 Summer Olympics
Sportspeople from Waltham, Massachusetts